The 1991 FIBA Under-19 World Championship (French: Championnat du monde des moins de 19 ans 1991 de la FIBA) was the 4th edition of the FIBA U19 World Championship. It was held in Edmonton, Canada from 26 July to 4 August 1991. The United States won their third championship in the tournament, after beating Italy in overtime 90–85 in the final. Dejan Bodiroga of Yugoslavia was named the tournament MVP, despite their team losing the bronze medal game against Argentina.

Venue

Qualified teams

Preliminary round

Group A

Group B

Group C

Group D

Quarterfinal round

Group E

Group F

Group G

Group H

Classification 13th–16th

Source: FIBA Archive

Semifinals

15th place

13th place

Classification 9th–12th

Source: FIBA Archive

Semifinals

11th place

9th place

Classification 5th–8th

Source: FIBA Archive

Semifinals

7th place

5th place

Final round

Source: FIBA Archive

Semifinals

3rd place

Final

Final standings

Source: FIBA Archive

Awards

References

External links
 FIBA Basketball Archive

1987
1987 in basketball
International youth basketball competitions hosted by Italy
1987–88 in Italian basketball
July 1987 sports events in Europe
August 1987 sports events in Europe